This is a list of the UTC time offsets, showing the difference in hours and minutes from Coordinated Universal Time (UTC), from the westernmost (−12:00) to the easternmost (+14:00). It includes countries and regions that observe them during standard time or year-round.

The main purpose of this page is to list the current standard time offsets of different countries, territories and regions. Information on daylight saving time or historical changes in offsets can be found in the individual offset articles (e.g. UTC+01:00) or the country-specific time articles (e.g. Time in Russia).

Places that observe daylight saving time (DST) during their respective summer periods are listed only once, at the offset for their winter (usually known as "standard") period; see their individual articles for more information. A source for detailed DST and historical information is the tz database. Note that there are many instances of unofficial observation of a different offset (and/or DST) than expected by areas close to borders, usually for economic reasons.

In the section names, the letter after the offset is that used in nautical time. If present, a dagger (†) indicates the usage of a nautical time zone letter outside of the standard geographic definition of that time zone.

Some zones that are north/south of each other in the mid Pacific differ by 24 hours in time – they have the same time of day but dates that are one day apart. The two extreme time zones on Earth (both in the mid Pacific) differ by 26 hours.

In the following list, only the rightmost indent of a group of locations is meant to indicate the area observing the offset; the places above and to the left are meant solely to indicate the area's parent administrative divisions. For example, the entry of Eucla explains that Eucla observes the specified time offset, and the state (Western Australia) and country (Australia) are shown only for reference and are not meant to be wholly included as observing that offset.

The purpose of the "principal cities" list at the top of some of the time zone entries is to give a brief list of major cities. These should be limited to a maximum of one city per country (within each zone), and not all countries in a zone need to have a city listed. Similarly, time zones need not have any cities listed if there are no major cities in that offset.

UTC−12:00, Y
United States Minor Outlying Islands
Baker Island
Howland Island

UTC−11:00, X

American Samoa
United States Minor Outlying Islands
Jarvis Island
Kingman Reef
Midway Atoll
Palmyra Atoll

Niue

UTC−10:00, W
Principal cities: Honolulu

French Polynesia (except Marquesas Islands and Gambier Islands)

Cook Islands
 (Hawaii–Aleutian Time Zone)
Alaska
Aleutian Islands west of 169°30′W
Hawaii
United States Minor Outlying Islands
Johnston Atoll

UTC−09:30, V†

French Polynesia
Marquesas Islands

UTC−09:00, V
Principal cities: Anchorage

French Polynesia
Gambier Islands
 (Alaska Time Zone)
Alaska
Except Aleutian Islands west of 169°30′W

UTC−08:00, U
Principal cities: Los Angeles, Vancouver, Tijuana

 (Pacific Time Zone)
British Columbia
Except Northern Rockies Regional Municipality, Peace River Regional District, and the south-eastern communities of Cranbrook, Golden and Invermere

Clipperton Island

Baja California

Pitcairn Islands
 (Pacific Time Zone)
California 
Idaho
 The northern counties of Benewah, Bonner, Boundary, Clearwater, Idaho, Kootenai, Latah, Lewis, Nez Perce and Shoshone
Nevada (except West Wendover)
Oregon
All of the state except Malheur County (but including a small strip in the south of Malheur)
Washington

UTC−07:00, T
Principal cities: Denver, Edmonton, Ciudad Juárez

 (Mountain Time Zone)
Alberta
British Columbia
 Northern Rockies Regional Municipality
 Peace River Regional District
 The south-eastern communities of Cranbrook, Golden and Invermere
Northwest Territories
Nunavut
Kitikmeot Region and all land to the west of 102nd meridian west
Saskatchewan
Lloydminster
Yukon

Baja California Sur, Chihuahua, Nayarit, Sinaloa and Sonora states
 (Mountain Time Zone)
Arizona
Colorado
Idaho
 Except the northern counties of Benewah, Bonner, Boundary, Clearwater, Idaho, Kootenai, Latah, Lewis, Nez Perce and Shoshone
Kansas
The western counties of Greeley, Hamilton, Sherman and Wallace
Montana
Nebraska
The western counties of Cherry (western part), Arthur, Banner, Box Butte, Cheyenne, Dawes, Deuel, Garden, Grant, Hooker, Keith, Kimball, Morrill, Perkins, Scotts Bluff, Sheridan, Sioux, Chase and Dundy.
Nevada
West Wendover
New Mexico
North Dakota
The southwestern counties of Adams, Billings, Bowman, Dunn (southern part), Golden Valley, Grant, Hettinger, McKenzie (southern part), Sioux (west of ND Route 31), Slope and Stark
Oregon
Malheur County (except a small strip in the south)
South Dakota
The western counties of Butte, Corson, Custer, Dewey, Fall River, Haakon, Harding, Lawrence, Meade, Pennington, Perkins, Shannon, Stanley (western part), Ziebach, Jackson and Bennett.
Texas
 The western counties of Culberson (northwestern part), El Paso and Hudspeth
Utah
Wyoming

UTC−06:00, S
Principal cities: Mexico City, Chicago, Guatemala City, Tegucigalpa, Winnipeg, San José, San Salvador

 (Central Time Zone)
Manitoba
Nunavut
Area between 85th meridian west and 102nd meridian west, except Southampton Island and adjoining islands, and all of Kitikmeot Region
Ontario
 West of 90° west
Saskatchewan
 Entire province except Lloydminster

Easter Island

Galápagos Islands

All except Baja California, Baja California Sur, Chihuahua, Nayarit, Quintana Roo, Sinaloa and Sonora.

 (Central Time Zone)
Alabama
Arkansas
Florida
The counties of Bay, Calhoun, Escambia, Holmes, Jackson, Okaloosa, Santa Rosa, Walton, and Washington, and northern Gulf County (panhandle)
Illinois
Indiana
Northwestern counties of Jasper, Lake, LaPorte, Newton, Porter and Starke
Southwestern counties of Gibson, Perry, Posey, Spencer, Vanderburgh and Warrick
Iowa
Kansas
Entire state except Greeley, Hamilton, Sherman and Wallace counties
Kentucky
The counties of Breckinridge, Grayson, Hart, Green, Adair, Russell and Clinton, and all counties to the west of these
Louisiana
Michigan
The western counties of Dickinson, Gogebic, Iron and Menominee
Minnesota
Mississippi
Missouri
Nebraska
 Except western counties of Cherry (western part), Hooker, Arthur, Banner, Box Butte, Cheyenne, Dawes, Deuel, Garden, Grant, Hooker, Keith, Kimball, Morrill, Perkins, Scotts Bluff, Sheridan, Sioux, Chase and Dundy.
North Dakota
Entire state except southwest
Oklahoma
South Dakota
 Except the western counties of Butte, Corson, Custer, Dewey, Fall River, Haakon, Harding, Lawrence, Meade, Pennington, Perkins, Shannon, Stanley (western part), Ziebach, Jackson and Bennett.
Tennessee
Counties located to the west of the counties of Scott, Morgan, Roane, Rhea, and Hamilton
Texas
 Excluding the western counties of Culberson (northwestern part), El Paso and Hudspeth
Wisconsin

UTC−05:00, R
Principal cities: New York, Toronto, Havana, Lima, Bogotá, Kingston, Quito

Acre
Amazonas (13 western municipalities, approximately marked by a line between Tabatinga and Porto Acre)
 (Eastern Time Zone)
Nunavut
East of 85th meridian west, and Southampton Island and adjoining islands 
Ontario
East of 90° West
Quebec
Most of province except easternmost area

 (except Galápagos Islands)

Quintana Roo

Cayman Islands
Turks and Caicos Islands
 (Eastern Time Zone)
Delaware
District of Columbia
Florida
Entire state except the counties of Bay, Calhoun, Escambia, Holmes, Jackson, Okaloosa, Santa Rosa, Walton, and Washington, and northern Gulf county (panhandle)
Georgia
Indiana
Except the northwestern counties of Jasper, Lake, LaPorte, Newton, Porter and Starke, and the southwestern counties of Gibson, Perry, Posey, Spencer, Vanderburgh and Warrick
Kentucky
Counties located to the east of the counties of Breckinridge, Grayson, Hart, Green, Adair, Russell and Clinton
Maryland
Michigan
Except the western counties of Dickinson, Gogebic, Iron and Menominee
New England (states of Connecticut, Massachusetts, Maine, New Hampshire, Rhode Island and Vermont)
New Jersey
New York
North Carolina
Ohio
Pennsylvania
South Carolina
Tennessee
The counties of Scott, Morgan, Roane, Rhea, Meigs and Bradley, and all counties to the east of these
Virginia
West Virginia
United States Minor Outlying Islands
Navassa Island

UTC−04:00, Q
Principal cities: Santiago, Santo Domingo, Manaus, Caracas, La Paz, Halifax

The states of Amazonas (except westernmost municipalities), Mato Grosso, Mato Grosso do Sul, Rondônia and Roraima
 (Atlantic Time Zone)
New Brunswick
Newfoundland and Labrador
Labrador
Except the area between L'Anse-au-Clair and Norman Bay
Nova Scotia
Prince Edward Island
Quebec
East of the 63°W longitude
 (except Easter Island and Magallanes/Antarctic)

Greenland
Pituffik (Thule)

Guadeloupe
Martinique
Saint Barthélemy
Saint Martin

Aruba
Caribbean Netherlands
Bonaire
Saba
Sint Eustatius
Curaçao
Sint Maarten

Anguilla
Bermuda
British Virgin Islands
Montserrat
 (Atlantic Time Zone)
Puerto Rico
U.S. Virgin Islands

UTC−03:30, P†
Principal cities: St. John’s

 (Newfoundland Time Zone)
Newfoundland and Labrador
Labrador
The area between L'Anse-au-Clair and Norman Bay
Newfoundland

UTC−03:00, P
Principal cities: São Paulo, Buenos Aires, Montevideo

Except the western states of Acre, Amazonas, Mato Grosso, Mato Grosso do Sul, Rondônia and Roraima; and offshore islands

Magallanes/Antarctic

Greenland
Except areas around Danmarkshavn, Ittoqqortoormiit and Pituffik (Thule)

French Guiana
Saint Pierre and Miquelon

Falkland Islands

UTC−02:00, O

Fernando de Noronha

South Georgia and the South Sandwich Islands

UTC−01:00, N

Greenland
Ittoqqortoormiit and surrounding area

Azores islands

UTC±00:00, Z
Principal cities: London, Dublin, Lisbon, Abidjan, Accra, Dakar

Faroe Islands
Greenland
Danmarkshavn and surrounding area

 (Including Madeira and excluding Azores islands)

Canary Islands

 (Including Guernsey, Isle of Man, Jersey and Saint Helena, Ascension and Tristan da Cunha)

UTC+01:00, A
Principal cities: Berlin, Rome, Paris, Madrid, Warsaw, Lagos, Kinshasa, Algiers, Casablanca

Western area, including Kinshasa.

 (Metropolitan)

 (Including Svalbard and Jan Mayen)

 (Including Balearic Islands, Ceuta and Melilla and excluding Canary Islands)

Gibraltar

UTC+02:00, B
Principal cities: Cairo, Johannesburg, Khartoum, Kyiv, Bucharest, Athens, Jerusalem, Sofia 

 (including Northern Cyprus)

Eastern area, including Lubumbashi and Mbuji-Mayi

 (including Transnistria)

Northwestern Federal District
Kaliningrad Oblast

 (except Prince Edward Islands)

Idlib, Aleppo and surrounding areas

Except Crimea (occupied by Russia), part of Donetsk and Luhansk regions

Akrotiri and Dhekelia

UTC+03:00, C
Principal cities: Moscow, Istanbul, Riyadh, Baghdad, Addis Ababa, Doha

French Southern and Antarctic Lands
Scattered Islands in the Indian Ocean
Mayotte

Abkhazia and South Ossetia (two self-proclaimed republics with limited recognition)

 – Moscow Time
Central Federal District
North Caucasian Federal District
Northwestern Federal District
Except Kaliningrad Oblast
Southern Federal District
Except Astrakhan Oblast
Volga Federal District
Except Samara Oblast, Saratov Oblast, Udmurtia, Ulyanovsk Oblast, Bashkortostan, Orenburg Oblast and Perm Krai

Prince Edward Islands

except Idlib, Aleppo and surrounding areas

Crimea (since the 2014 Russian annexation of Crimea fully controlled by Russia), part of Donetsk and Luhansk regions (the self-proclaimed Donetsk People's Republic and Luhansk People's Republic)

UTC+03:30, C†
Principal cities: Tehran

UTC+04:00, D
Principal cities: Dubai, Baku, Tbilisi, Yerevan, Samara

French Southern and Antarctic Lands
Crozet Islands
Réunion

Except Abkhazia and South Ossetia

 – Samara Time
Southern Federal District
Astrakhan Oblast
Volga Federal District
Samara Oblast, Saratov Oblast, Udmurtia and Ulyanovsk Oblast

UTC+04:30, D†
Principal cities: Kabul

UTC+05:00, E
Principal cities: Karachi, Tashkent, Yekaterinburg

Heard Island and McDonald Islands

French Southern and Antarctic Lands
Île Amsterdam
Île Saint-Paul
Kerguelen Islands

The provinces of Aktobe, Atyrau, Kyzylorda, Mangystau and West Kazakhstan

 – Yekaterinburg Time 
Ural Federal District
Volga Federal District
Bashkortostan, Orenburg Oblast and Perm Krai

UTC+05:30, E†
Principal cities: Mumbai, Colombo

UTC+05:45, E*
Principal cities: Kathmandu

UTC+06:00, F
Principal cities: Dhaka, Almaty, Omsk

Except the provinces of Aktobe, Atyrau, Kyzylorda, Mangystau and West Kazakhstan

 – Omsk Time
Siberian Federal District
Omsk Oblast

British Indian Ocean Territory

UTC+06:30, F†
Principal cities: Yangon

Cocos (Keeling) Islands

UTC+07:00, G
Principal cities: Jakarta, Surabaya, Medan, Pontianak, Ho Chi Minh City, Bangkok, Krasnoyarsk

Christmas Island

Western part
 Sumatra, Java, and Kalimantan (only provinces of Central Kalimantan, and West Kalimantan)

Western part, including Hovd
 – Krasnoyarsk Time
Siberian Federal District
Altai Krai
Altai Republic
Kemerovo Oblast
Khakassia
Krasnoyarsk Krai
Novosibirsk Oblast
Tomsk Oblast
Tuva

UTC+08:00, H
Principal cities: Shanghai, Taipei, Kuala Lumpur, Singapore, Perth, Manila, Irkutsk, Makassar, Denpasar, Kupang

Western Australia (except Eucla)

Central part
 Kalimantan (only provinces of East Kalimantan, North Kalimantan, and South Kalimantan), Sulawesi, and Lesser Sunda Islands (including Bali, and West Timor)

Eastern part, including Ulaanbaatar

 – Irkutsk Time
Far Eastern Federal District
Buryatia
Siberian Federal District
Irkutsk Oblast

UTC+08:45, H*

Western Australia
 Eucla

UTC+09:00, I
Principal cities: Tokyo, Seoul, Pyongyang, Chita, Jayapura, Ambon

Eastern part
 Maluku Islands, Western New Guinea (Papua, Central Papua, Highland Papua, South Papua, Southwest Papua, and West Papua)

 
Far Eastern Federal District
Amur Oblast, Sakha Republic (western part; west of the Lena River as well as territories adjacent to the Lena on the eastern side), Zabaykalsky Krai

UTC+09:30, I†
Principal cities: Adelaide

New South Wales
Broken Hill
Northern Territory 
South Australia

UTC+10:00, K
Principal cities: Sydney, Port Moresby, Vladivostok

Australian Capital Territory
New South Wales (except Broken Hill)
Queensland
Tasmania
Victoria

Western part

All of the country except Autonomous Region of Bougainville
 – Vladivostok Time
Far Eastern Federal District
Jewish Autonomous Oblast, Khabarovsk Krai, Primorsky Krai and Sakha Republic (central part; east of 140 degrees longitude and including the Abyysky, Allaikhovsky, Momsky, Nizhnekolymsky, and Srednekolymsky districts)

Guam
Northern Mariana Islands

UTC+10:30, K†

New South Wales
Lord Howe Island

UTC+11:00, L
Principal cities: Nouméa

Norfolk Island

Eastern part

New Caledonia

Autonomous Region of Bougainville
 – Magadan Time
Far Eastern Federal District
Magadan Oblast, Sakhalin Oblast and Sakha Republic (eastern part: Oymyakonsky, Ust-Yansky, and Verkhoyansky districts)

UTC+12:00, M
Principal cities: Auckland, Suva, Petropavlovsk-Kamchatsky

Wallis and Futuna

Gilbert Islands

 (except Chatham Islands)
 – Kamchatka Time 
Far Eastern Federal District
Chukotka Autonomous Okrug and Kamchatka Krai

Wake Island

UTC+12:45, M*

Chatham Islands

UTC+13:00, M†

Phoenix Islands

Tokelau

UTC+14:00, M†

Line Islands

See also
 180th meridian
 List of military time zones
 List of time zones by country
 List of time zone abbreviations
 List of tz database time zones
 Time zone
 Time zone abolition

References

External links
Time zone map at timeanddate.com

Time zones

fr:Liste des fuseaux horaires
id:Daftar zona waktu
pt:Anexo:Lista de fusos horários
sh:Popis vremenskih zona
sv:Lista över länders tidszoner